Oberleutnant Ludwig Franz Stigler (21 August 1915 – 22 March 2008) was a German fighter pilot and fighter ace in World War II.

He is best known for his role in a December 1943 incident in which he spared the crew of a severely damaged B-17 bomber. He escorted the plane to safety over enemy lines. The story was kept secret for many years, but in 1990 the two pilots finally reunited and were close friends until their deaths in 2008. Stigler died in Canada, where he moved after the war.

Early life 
Stigler was born on 21 August 1915 in Regensburg, Bavaria. His father was a World War I pilot/observer.

Stigler began flying gliders when he was 12, and in 1933, he piloted a biplane. He flew for Deutsche Luft Hansa (the predecessor of Lufthansa) before joining the Luftwaffe in 1940.

Military service 
In the Luftwaffe, Stigler became an instructor pilot. One of his students was Gerhard Barkhorn, who went on to down over 300 planes in combat. Stigler himself flew 487 combat missions, downing 28 planes while himself being shot down 17 times (he bailed out six times and landed in a damaged plane 11 times). His brother, August, who was also a pilot, was killed in the crash of a Ju 88 in August 1940.

As a member of Jagdgeschwader (JG) 27 in North Africa as well as Europe, and of the Jagdverband (JV) 44 jet fighter squadron, the aircraft Stigler flew in combat were the Bf 109 and Me 262.

Stigler—under the spelling Stiegler—is alleged to have been a member of a group of II/JG 27 pilots who made false kill claims in the Western Desert. From 10 July 1942 to 16 August 1942, Stiegler made at least 14 kill claims. The II/JG group was prevented from flying together after 59-kill ace Hans-Arnold Stahlschmidt reported that he saw them shooting into the dunes of the desert during a mission in which they claimed 12 kills (two correct kills by Stiegler).

B-17 incident 

On 20 December 1943, Stigler met a B-17 bomber nicknamed Ye Olde Pub and its American pilot Charles "Charlie" Brown for the first time. Stigler had shot down two B-17s earlier that day and he soon caught up to a wounded B-17 flown by Brown. Lining up to finish the bomber and shoot it down, he noticed the tail gunner never moved the guns. Upon further inspection of the airplane, he saw through large holes in the fuselage a frantic crew trying to save the lives of their fellow airmen, and decided not to fire.

Stigler is quoted as saying "and for me it would have been the same as shooting at a parachute", in reference to a statement by his commander and mentor Gustav Rödel; "If I hear of one of you shooting a man in a parachute, I'll shoot you myself!". Stigler motioned to Brown to land his airplane in neutral Sweden because of the extensive damage. However, Brown didn't understand and decided to keep flying towards England. Stigler escorted the B-17 and its crew to the North Sea coast, protecting it from German anti-aircraft gunners (who recognized the silhouette of his BF-109 and held fire). Once they were over water, Stigler saluted Brown, then left to return to base.

Aftermath
Stigler never spoke of the incident as he could have been court-martialed and executed. Brown told his commanding officers, who chose to keep the incident secret. Years later, in 1990, Brown searched for the German pilot who let them live that day, and eventually the two pilots, along with the Pub crew, met face to face, half a century later.

Between 1990 and 2008, Brown and Stigler became close friends and remained so until their deaths within several months of each other in 2008.

References

1915 births
2008 deaths
German World War II flying aces
Military personnel from Regensburg
German emigrants to Canada
Luftwaffe pilots